Bakulipanam Percy Paul Mokungah, widely known by his stage name Panam Percy Paul, is a Nigerian  gospel singer, songwriter and multi-instrumentalist whose musical career spans 40 years. He was born to major Paul Harley, an officer in the Nigerian Army, and composer Paulina Paul Mokungah in 1958. Paul's kind of music is praise and worship styled in the feel of country music and African high life.

Musical career
Panam Percy Paul started his musical career at age twenty while he was still in school as an undergraduate at Kaduna Polytechnic. He worked at Radio ELWA Christian Communications as a production supervisor and engineer.

Personal life
Panam Pacy Paul is from Numan, in Adamawa State, and lived in Jos for 35 years. Paul married his wife, Tina, in 1981. Together, they have four children.

Awards and nominations

Discography

Studio albums
Beautiful People (1976)
Oh Ye Gates (1978)
Don`t You Cry (1980)
Bring Down the Glory 1 (1984)
Panam Percy Paul and Friends (1987)
Bring Down the Glory 2: God of War (1989)
At This Christmas with Panam Percy Paul (1991)
Bring Down The Glory 3: Higher Than High (1993)
Master of the Universe (1995)
Bring Down the Glory 4: Deep Intimacy (2003)
Cheer up (2007)
Destiny (2009) 
Return
Bring Down Your Glory 5: Throne Of Grace (2013)

Other works
Apart from music, Panam has written a book titled “Bring Down the Glory”, named after his album.  He also has a college called the “Panam College of Music Ministry” in Jos, Plateau state of Nigeria. His record label Panam Music World serves as an organization to assist the education of musicians.

References

Living people
Nigerian gospel singers
Nigerian guitarists
Nigerian harmonica players
People from Adamawa State
1957 births
Nigerian Christians